François Pilon (born August 25, 1958) is a politician in the Canadian province of Quebec. He was elected to the House of Commons of Canada in the 2011 federal election as the member for Laval—Les Îles. Pilon is a member of the New Democratic Party.

Background

Pilon was born in 1958 in Laval and has a background in architectural design. He is active in the labour movement, having served as vice-president of the Syndicat des Cols Bleus de la Ville de Laval from late 1998 to 2006. In 1999, he helped lead his union into the Canadian Union of Public Employees.

He was elected to the Canadian House of Commons on his fourth attempt, previously running in the riding of Honoré-Mercier, which the NDP also took in 2011.

He is not to be confused with another François Pilon who has run for the Green Party in Montreal.

Electoral record

References

External links

1958 births
Trade unionists from Quebec
New Democratic Party MPs
Members of the House of Commons of Canada from Quebec
Living people
Politicians from Laval, Quebec
21st-century Canadian politicians